Cryptella canariensis is a species of air-breathing land semislug with a small shell, a terrestrial pulmonate gastropod mollusk in the family Parmacellidae. This species is also known as Parmacella canariensis.

Distribution
This species is endemic to the Canary Islands.

Description 
The animal is greyish to yellowish brown, with black spots or streaks on the mantle and on the sides, mantle length 55% of body. The animal grows up to 40 mm long.

The shell has a smooth, thick and brown-yellow apex.

References
This article incorporates public domain text from the reference.

External links 
  Webb P. B. & Berthelot S. (1844) Histoire naturelle des îles Canaries II, 2. Zoologie. page 50
   Webb P. B. & Berthelot S. (1835) Magasin de Zoologie: d'anatomie comparée et de palaeontologie. volume 5, Arthus Bertrand, Paris. - Cryptelle
 Photo of the shell

Endemic fauna of the Canary Islands
Parmacellidae
Gastropods described in 1833